Ugochukwu Chiedozie Monye (born 13 April 1983) is an English sports pundit and former rugby union player, Monye played 14 times for , 241 times for his only club Harlequins and played twice for the British & Irish Lions on their 2009 tour to South Africa.  Monye won both the second division and then the Premiership title with Harlequins, as well as winning the European Rugby Challenge Cup.

Career

Youth career
As a youth Monye competed in the English Schools' Championships finishing 5th in his heat with a time of 11.10 seconds in the 100 metres at the age of 18. He is friends with Olympians Mark Lewis-Francis and Tyrone Edgar who also competed in the English Schools' Championship.

Monye played for Hampshire RFC U17s and U20s.

Breakthrough and sevens
Harlequins offered him a professional contract and within 12 months he was a member of the England RFU Sevens team that won the Hong Kong Sevens. Monye was a key member of the Sevens squad throughout the 2002–03 and 2003–04 IRB World Sevens Series, and was part of the team that competed in the 2005 Rugby World Cup Sevens in Hong Kong. He was also part of the England RFU Saxons sides that won the Churchill Cup in 2005 and 2008. He first played for Harlequins in a friendly against Glasgow Warriors RFC in August 2002, beginning the following season with five tries in two matches, including a hat trick against Rotherham Titans at Millmoor.

Monye scored five tries against Exeter Chiefs in Harlequins' 70–5 victory at Twickenham Stoop as the side returned to the Guinness Premiership after a season in National One during which Monye scored 16 tries. Before the 2009–10 season, he had run in 47 tries in 105 games for the club.

International debut
Monye scored his first try for England against Scotland at Twickenham in the Six Nations on 21 March 2009.
Monye made his England debut in England's 39–13 victory over the Pacific Islanders at Twickenham in 2008 and started the rest of the autumn internationals against Australia, South Africa and New Zealand.

Selected for the 2009 Lions' tour of South Africa Monye made the XV for the first Test in Durban. In the first half he was prevented from scoring as he dived over the try line when Jean de Villiers got his hand underneath the ball to prevent a try. In the second half, Monye was through to score but was tackled by Morne Steyn and lost control of the ball.

The Lions lost the Test and Monye lost his place, being replaced by Luke Fitzgerald. The Lions lost the second Test and Monye was recalled, redeeming himself with a 70-metre intercepted try although the Lions lost the series 2–1.  He was the highest Lions try scorer of the tour with five tries.

Club success
In September 2010, Ugo suffered a career-threatening injury and after surgery he was sidelined for 12 weeks. This ruled him out of Martin Johnson's England Squad for the Autumn Test Series and consequently the 2011 Six Nations tournament. He returned to play for Harlequins who he helped to win the Amlin Challenge Cup, before being named in the England training squad for the 2011 Rugby World Cup at the end of the season.

Monye started for Harlequins in their 2011–12 Premiership final victory over Leicester Tigers.

On 24 March 2015, Monye announced he was retiring at the end of the season.

Chair of independent advisory group on diversity 
In April 2021, Monye was appointed chair of the Rugby Football Union's independent advisory group on diversity.

In June 2022, during an interview with The Telegraph, Monye argued that rugby union needed to tackle its "heavy drinking" and "laddish" culture in order to become fully inclusive.

Brand ambassador 
Ugo Monye presents the Rugby Union Weekly podcast for the BBC in partnership with journalist Chris Jones. The pair have worked together since January 2017. In November 2017 it was announced that England scrum half Danny Care would co-host the podcast whenever Jones is unavailable. He is also currently presenting on BT Sport, and has worked as a brand Ambassador for Maximuscle too. In July 2021, it was announced that Monye and Sam Quek would be the new team captains on BBC's Question of Sport quiz show.

From September 2021 Monye was a contestant for the nineteenth series of Strictly Come Dancing, paired with professional dancer Oti Mabuse. The couple finished in 11th place. On 21 October Monye announced that he and his wife had split.

Personal life 
Monye's father died shortly before his appearance on BBC's Strictly Come Dancing.

He is a committed Christian.

References

External links
 Harlequins profile
 England profile
 Ugo Monye – Maximuscle Ambassador profile
 Ugo Monye - Engage Ambassador profile

1983 births
Living people
Black British sportspeople
British & Irish Lions rugby union players from England
England international rugby union players
English people of Nigerian descent
English rugby union players
Harlequin F.C. players
People educated at Lord Wandsworth College
Rugby union players from London Borough of Islington
Rugby union centres